Bamur railway station is a railway station on the East Coast Railway network in the state of Odisha, India. It serves Bamur village. Its code is BAMR. It has three platforms. Passenger, Express and Superfast trains halt at Bamur railway station.

Major Trains

 Sambalpur - Puri Intercity Express
 Bhubaneswar - Bolangir Intercity Superfast Express

See also
 Angul district

References

Railway stations in Angul district
Sambalpur railway division